Stanislas Kaburungu (born 7 October 1935 in Gisanze) is a Burundian clergyman and bishop for the Roman Catholic Diocese of Ngozi. He became ordained in 1961 and was appointed bishop in 1968. He resigned in 2002.

References

20th-century Roman Catholic bishops in Burundi
1935 births
Living people
Roman Catholic bishops of Ngozi